Singapore International School, Bandung was a former SIS branch opened in July 2007 affiliated with SIS Group of Schools, Indonesia.

The campus in Citra Green, Dago included a multi-purpose hall, library, IT laboratory, science laboratories, soccer field, canteen, and indoor playground. Singapore School Bandung uses the Singapore Curriculum and uses English, Mandarin, and Indonesian as a medium of instruction. For primary students, core subjects include science, mathematics, Indonesian, English, Chinese, and Social Studies. For secondary levels, core subjects are science, geography, mathematics, English, and Chinese. 

Due to a change in management of the building in Citra Green, Dago in 2009, SIS Bandung was relocated to a much smaller campus in the heart of downtown Bandung and eventually closed its doors in 2011. The much smaller downtown campus is currently occupied by UNISBA. 

After SIS' relocation to downtown Bandung in 2009, the former campus in Citra Green, Dago was occupied by a newly established school called Stamford International School (renamed Stamford School later on in 2015) until its closure in 2021. As of 2022, the Citra Green campus has since been occupied by a new school; Global Prestasi School (GPS) Bandung.   

As of 2022, there are plans for SIS to re-open a campus in Bandung in the near future

See also
Singapore International School, Indonesia - Jakarta

Notes

External links
 https://web.archive.org/web/20080326224723/http://www.sis-bandung.com/
 http://www.sisschools.org
 https://web.archive.org/web/20170626110150/http://sisindonesia.com/

Singaporean international schools in Indonesia
Schools in Bandung
Educational institutions established in 2007
2007 establishments in Indonesia